Thisted Fodbold Club is an association football club based in the town of Thisted, North Jutland, Denmark, that competes in the Danish 2nd Division, the third tier of the Danish football league system. Founded in 1989, it is shortly known as 'TFC' and affiliated to the DBU Jutland, the regional body of football in Jutland. The team plays its home matches at Sparekassen Thy Arena, formerly known as 'Lerpytter Stadion', where it has been based since its foundation in 1989.

Former footballer Jesper Grønkjær, who played for Chelsea and Atlético Madrid, amongst others, began his career in the Thisted FC youth academy.

Players

First-team squad

-

Former players

  Renato De Vecchi
  Mark Ryutin
  Jesper Grønkjær

References

External links
 Official site

Football clubs in Denmark
Thisted
Association football clubs established in 1989
1989 establishments in Denmark